Tetragonotheca helianthoides is a species of flowering plant that grows in the southeastern United States. It is a perennial dicot in the Asteraceae family. Common names for it include pineland nerveray, squarehead, and pineland ginseng. It produces an achene fruit. Several two-foot stems grow from its crown and it has a thick taproot. It has yellow flowers.

References

Millerieae
Flora of the Southeastern United States